Khondkar Delwar Hossain (1 February 1933 – 16 March 2011) was a Bangladesh Nationalist Party politician. He served as the secretary general of the party. He was elected five times as a Member of Parliament from constituency Manikganj-1 (Ghior-Doulatpur).

Delwar was awarded Ekushey Padak in 2005 by the government of Bangladesh.

Early life and career
Delwar was born in Manikganj in 1933. He obtained his law degree from the University of Dhaka in 1955 and was considered to be an excellent law student. He started his political career through the Bengali Language Movement in 1952. He also contested the 1954 elections from the Jukta Front. In the 1970 Pakistani general election he stood as a nominee of the National Awami Party faction led by Muzaffar Ahmed (NAP (M)).

Hossain died on 16 March 2011 at the age of 78 in a hospital in Singapore City.

References

1933 births
2011 deaths
People from Manikganj District
20th-century Bangladeshi lawyers
University of Dhaka alumni
Bangladesh Nationalist Party politicians
General Secretaries of Bangladesh Nationalist Party
2nd Jatiya Sangsad members
5th Jatiya Sangsad members
6th Jatiya Sangsad members
7th Jatiya Sangsad members
8th Jatiya Sangsad members
Recipients of the Ekushey Padak
20th-century Pakistani lawyers